Suliasi Tupou Ahio (born 3 August 1982), better known as Bowie Tupou, is an Australian professional boxer.

Tupou has peaked at 13th in the WBO rankings after winning the WBO African title against Hunter Sam in March 2015. Tupou lost the title in August 2015 against Joseph Parker.

Early life
Tupou moved to Mt Druitt at age of 11, then to Newtown, New South Wales when he got married. Before becoming a boxer, Bowie played professional rugby league football in Australia for the Penrith Panthers in the under 21s. In 2001 Tupou was selected to tour New Zealand, which included a game against Southland under-21 in Queenstown. His NRL career never happened due to being sucked into the booze culture and he fell into that trap like many youngsters can. Tupou wife was the first person to suggest boxing as a sport, to help get him back on track and install some discipline in his life.

Professional boxing career
He began his boxing career training with Johnny Lewis, Australia's most well-known boxing coach, having trained Jeff Fenech, Jeff Harding, Virgil Hill and Kostya Tszyu. After only one amateur bout, he knocked out his opponent in the first round. Tupou made his pro debut on 18 February 2006 in South Windsor, New South Wales, Australia, against Brian Fitzgerald. Tupou won the evenly fought battle by a majority decision. Six months later on a rematch with Fitzgerald, Tupou picked up the lightly regarded New South Wales Heavyweight title. At the end of 2006 he settled in Los Angeles where he started training with Justin Fortune at the Pound4Pound Gym.

In 2007 he signed with Gary Shaw and made his U.S. debut on 7 September. In April 2008 he signed with a new coach Jeff Mayweather. He has beaten his first club fighters in Cisse Salif and Ray Hayes. In 2009 he was KOd by club fighter Demetrice King but a 2011 KO of Manuel Quezada and a points win over Donnell Holmes have restored some credibility. Bowie now resides in Las Vegas, NV. In 2012 he was KOd by Malik Scott and Bryant Jennings.

Returning to Australia
When returning to Australia in 2013, Tupou started training with Jeff French. Since that return he had a three win streak with wins over Hunter Sam, Nick Guivas and Junior Maletino Iakopo. After the three wins Tupou received his first major world rankings, ranked 13th in WBO and winning the WBO African title. Five months after winning the title, Tupou suffered his forth lose to Joseph Parker.

In 2016, Tupou won his rematch against Hunter Sam after both boxers taking the fight on a weeks notice. Tupou won the fight by TKO. Tupou had its last regional title shot against the tallest boxer in the world, New Zealand American Julius Long. Long won the Interim WBA title by Split Decision, his biggest win of his career. Tupou has not fought since.

Professional boxing titles
Australian New South Wales State
Australia – New South Wales State heavyweight title (262½Ibs)
World Boxing Organisation
WBO Africa heavyweight title (284½Ibs)

Professional boxing record

References

1982 births
Living people
Heavyweight boxers
Tongan male boxers
Australian male boxers
Tongan emigrants to Australia
Australian Latter Day Saints
Tongan Latter Day Saints